The 1902 Colorado Silver and Gold football team was an American football team that represented the University of Colorado as a member of the Colorado Football Association (CFA) during the 1902 college football season. Led by seventh-year head coach Fred Folsom, Colorado compiled an overall record of 5–1 with a mark of 4–0 in conference play, winning the CFA title for the second consecutive season.

Schedule

References

Colorado
Colorado Buffaloes football seasons
Colorado Football Association football champion seasons
Colorado Silver and Gold football